The Cathedral Statutes Act 1707 (6 Ann c 75) was an Act of the Parliament of Great Britain.

It was repealed by section 54(1) of, and Schedule 2 to, the Cathedrals Measure 1963 (No 2).

References
Halsbury's Statutes,

Great Britain Acts of Parliament 1707